Folgore Division is a 1955 Italian war film directed by Duilio Coletti. It is based on actual events and depicts the 185th Airborne Division Folgore during the battle of El-Alamein. The screenwriter and military advisor was Marcantonio Bragadin.

Plot 
In the summer of 1942, during the Second World War, a group of young paratroopers from the Folgore Division, after having undergone a long and tiring training in Italy, was transported by air to the Libyan desert to cover the Italian-German front. The young soldiers believe that their destination is the island of Malta (operation C3) or the area of Alexandria: instead they find themselves thrown into a desert region where they are forced to live in holes dug in the sand and to face with insufficient means the armored British armored units. They will sadly see their parachutes piled up inside a warehouse in the desert. Thus develops that epic fight, which takes the name of the battle of El-Alamein, in which a handful of heroic fighters try with every effort to stop or at least delay the advance of General Montgomery's British tanks. Once their line-up has broken through, the survivors resist for several days an unequal struggle against the preponderant English forces, even being mentioned, for their heroism, by the British Prime Minister Winston Churchill, who called them "The lions of the Thunderbolt".

Cast 
Ettore Manni: The Captain
Fausto Tozzi: The Sergeant
José Jaspe: Salvi
Marco Guglielmi: Lt. Corsini
Aldo Bufi Landi: Friar Gabriele
Monica Clay: Captain's Wife
Lea Padovani:   Salvi's Wife
Mario Girotti: Paratrooper
Fabrizio Mioni: Gianluigi Corsini
Fernando Cicero
Carlo Tamberlani

References

External links

1955 films
1955 war films
Italian war drama films
Films directed by Duilio Coletti
Films scored by Nino Rota
North African campaign films
Italian World War II films
Italian black-and-white films
1950s Italian films